Gojnik Vlastimirović or Gojnik of Serbia was a Serbian Župan who was subject to his elder brother Mutimir, the Grand Župan of the Serbian lands (Rascia) from ca. 850-860 with his brother Strojimir. He was the youngest son of Vlastimir of Serbia, the first independent ruler of Rascia.

Gojnik, together with his brothers Strojimir and Mutimir, defeated the Bulgar Army sent by Tsar Boris and led by his son Vladimir, who was together with 12 boyars captured by the Serbs. Peace was agreed and two sons of Mutimir (Pribislav and Stefan) escorted prisoners towards the border at Stari Ras. There Boris gave them rich gifts and was given 2 slaves, 2 falcons, two dogs, and 80 furs by Mutimir.

Soon after this in the 860s the younger brothers start a rebellion against Mutimir after he had given them less and less power. Mutimir crushes the rebellion and the two brothers are sent as prisoners, a guarantee of peace, to Tsar Boris I court at Pliska, the Bulgar capital. He was treated well by the Bulgarians, Khan Boris himself chose the wife of Klonimir Strojimirović, the only son of Strojimir.

In 2006, a golden seal of Gojnik's brother, prince Strojimir, dated to 855-896, was bought by the Serbian state from an auction in Munich, Germany, from an unknown Russian. It was sold for a total 20,000 €, topping the Bulgarian offer of 15,000 €. It is of Byzantine handcraft (from Athens, Thessaloniki or Constantinople), weighs 15.64 g, has a cross and Greek inscription: "God, help Strojimir".

References

Sources

 
 
 
 
 Ferjančić, B. 1997, "Basile I et la restauration du pouvoir byzantin au IXème siècle", Zbornik Radova Vizantološkog Instituta, no. 36, pp. 9–30.

External links
 Steven Runciman, A History of the First Bulgarian Empire, London 1930.
 

Eastern Orthodox monarchs
9th-century Serbian royalty
Vlastimirović dynasty
People of the Bulgarian–Serbian Wars
Slavic warriors